Liu Heng may refer to:

 Liu Heng (202 BC–157 BC), posthumously known as Emperor Wen of Han 
 Liu Heng (born 1954), Chinese writer
 Liu Heng (born 1996), Chinese footballer